John Britt Daniel (born April 14, 1971) is an American musician. He is the co-founder, lead singer and guitarist of the rock band Spoon, as well as the co-founder, guitarist, bassist, and singer of the band Divine Fits. Daniel also founded numerous other bands in the early 1990s.

Early life 
Britt Daniel was born in Galveston, Texas and grew up in Temple, Texas, a town of 73,000 people about an hour north of Austin. Daniel is the oldest of three children from his parents' marriage. He also has two younger half-siblings. His father, a neurologist, was a fan of the Beatles and the Rolling Stones and a collector of guitars;  Daniel himself reportedly picked up the guitar in high school after his college-bound girlfriend ended their relationship.

Career 
In 1988 Britt Daniel formed his first band The Zygotes while in high school. In 1990, while a student at the University of Texas at Austin, Daniel formed his second band, Skellington, with Travis Hartnett, Mac Stringfellow, Paul Cannon and Mike Hurewitz. Skellington recorded and self-released This Town's Gone Dry in 1991, and the Skellington EP was released a year later in 1992. Before breaking up, the band released Skellington Rex, which contained songs that were re-recorded on Spoon's debut album Telephono.

The following year, Daniel joined a three-piece rockabilly band named The Alien Beats with Brad Shenfeld. During a 1993 Alien Beats recording session, computer-chip designer and percussionist Jim Eno was brought in as a substitute drummer, and was later made the permanent drummer. The Alien Beats released a 7" single in May 1993, disbanding soon after.

On 5 May 2018, Daniel appeared on NPR's news quiz show Wait Wait... Don't Tell Me! for the regular celebrity question segment "Not My Job".

Spoon 
In 1993, Daniel and ex-Alien Beats drummer Eno, along with guitarist Greg Wilson and bassist Andy McGuire, formed Spoon. Spoon has served as Daniel's primary musical focus.

Drake Tungsten 

Drake Tungsten was the pseudonym which Daniel performed under from 1994 to 1996 as a solo artist. When The Alien Beats disbanded in 1993, he decided to focus his music career on solo material that he had written over the previous years - songs that were more experimental and unfit for the styles of bands that he had previously played. Rather than releasing them under his proper name, Daniel decided to release them under the pseudonym Drake Tungsten. His first such album, Clocking Out Is For Suckers, was released in 1994 on cassette, and was distributed around his home town of Austin, Texas. Two years later, Tungsten released the five-song EP Six Pence for the Sauces on local label Peek-A-Boo Records. Also in 1996, Daniel began working again with drummer Jim Eno (previously from The Alien Beats) and began writing music under the moniker Spoon. Five tracks that were released by Tungsten were later re-recorded and re-release by Spoon: "I Could Be Underground" on the 30 Gallon Tank EP; "Chicago At Night" on the Girls Can Tell LP; and "All the Negatives Have Been Destroyed", "Dismember", and "I Wanted To Be Your Friend" on Telephono.

Britt Daniel stopped using this pseudonym in 1996, and has not recorded a solo album since self-releasing of Six Pence for the Sauces. However, he has begun setting aside songs for a possible solo album, including "New York Kiss" and "Telephone My Heart," which he has been performing at solo shows since at least early 2006 (see ).

The pseudonym "Drake Tungsten" appears to be an homage to Episode 410 (first airing in 1992) of the comic television series Mystery Science Theater 3000.  "Drake Tungsten" was one of several "tough guy names" proposed by the characters to fit the model of a monosyllabic first name followed by a metal or hard surface as a last name.  Others included "Nick Pigiron" and "Russ Tilefloor."

Solo work Britt Daniel

Daniel has reportedly begun setting aside songs for a possible solo album, including "New York Kiss" and "Telephone My Heart," which he has been performing at solo shows since at least early 2006.

Divine Fits 
From 2011 to 2013, Daniel was involved in a new band called Divine Fits, consisting of members from Spoon, Wolf Parade and New Bomb Turks. The group's debut, A Thing Called Divine Fits, was released on August 28, 2012 through Merge Records. The first single from the album, "My Love Is Real", was released on July 10, 2012.

Collaborations 
 In 1999, Daniel played bass for two gigs in the glam rock supergroup Golden Millennium, composed of fellow Peek-A-Boo Records labelmates.
 In 2002, Daniel worked with Bright Eyes on the fourth volume of Post-Parlo's Home Series.
 In 2002, Daniel recorded bass, keyboards and backing vocals on the first Sally Crewe & The Sudden Moves album, "Drive It Like You Stole It" (12XU).
 Daniel has produced songs for the bands I Love You But I've Chosen Darkness and Interpol.
 In 2004, Daniel remixed Interpol's "Slow Hands," which appears on the "Slow Hands" single.
 He previously worked as a sound designer and composer for the computer game company Origin Systems.
 In 2006, Daniel teamed up with Brian Reitzell and helped create some of the original music for the film Stranger Than Fiction.
 He also appeared in the Veronica Mars episode "Rashard and Wallace Go to White Castle", air date February 1, 2006, in which he sang a karaoke version of Elvis Costello's "Veronica."
 In 2009, he produced the White Rabbits album It's Frightening.
 In 2015, he collaborated with Austin band Sweet Spirit on the song "Have Mercy" and a cover of Spoon's Paper Tiger.
 In 2022, he sings harmonies with Conrad Keely on the song "Growing Divide" by the band ...And You Will Know Us by the Trail of Dead, from the album XI: Bleed Here Now.

Discography

Skellington
 The Town's Gone Dry (1991) Self-Released
 Skellington EP (1992) Self-Released
 Skellington Rex (1992) Self-Released

The Alien Beats
 Cavin' In (1993) Syncretic Records

Drake Tungsten
 Clocking Out Is For Suckers LP (1994, self-released)
 Six Pence for the Sauces EP (1996, Peek-A-Boo Records)
 "Dozy Vs. Drake - Upon Further Consideration" Single (1998, Revival Records)
  A song entitled "This is a Whipping" appeared on the Peek-A-Boo Records 1995 Compilation Bicycle Rodeo Bicycle Rodeo.

Golden Millennium
 Golden Millennium (1999) Peek-A-Boo Records

Spoon
 Telephono (1996) Matador Records
 Soft Effects (1997) Matador Records
 A Series of Sneaks (1998) Elektra Records
 The Agony of Laffitte (1998) Saddle Creek
 Love Ways (2000) Merge Records
 Girls Can Tell (2001) Merge Records
 Kill the Moonlight (2002) Merge Records
 Gimme Fiction (2005) Merge Records
 Ga Ga Ga Ga Ga (2007) Merge Records
 Transference (2010) Merge Records
 They Want My Soul (2014) Loma Vista Recordings
 Hot Thoughts (2017) Matador Records
 Lucifer on the Sofa (2022) Matador Records

Divine Fits
 A Thing Called Divine Fits (2012) Merge Records

Solo recordings
 Home: Volume IV (2002) Post-Parlo

See also 
 Spoon
 Divine Fits

References

External links

 Britt Daniel collection at Internet Archive live music archive
 Peek-A-Boo Records: Drake Tungsten page
 Spoon Official Website

American rock songwriters
American male singer-songwriters
American rock singers
American rock guitarists
People from Galveston, Texas
Writers from Austin, Texas
Musicians from Austin, Texas
Living people
Origin Systems people
Singer-songwriters from Texas
Guitarists from Texas
1971 births
American male guitarists
Spoon (band) members
21st-century American singers
21st-century American guitarists
21st-century American male singers